A majoritarian electoral system is an electoral system where the candidate with the most votes takes the seat using the winner-takes-all principle and in this way provides majoritarian representation. However, there are many electoral systems considered majoritarian based on different definitions, including types of at-large majoritarian representation such as block voting or party block voting (general ticket), but district-based majoritarian systems such as first-past-the-post voting (FPTP/SMP). Where two candidates are in the running, the one with the most votes will have a majority, but where there are three or more candidates, it often happens that no candidate takes a majority of the votes (see Plurality (voting)).

Majoritarian representation is applied here to mean district contests, not overall representation. It does not mean the party with the most votes will receive a majority of seats, but under First past the post the party with the most votes does usually take a majority of the seats. Common arguments for or against such systems usually take this into account. One example of a non-plurality (true-majoritarian) winner-takes-all system is Instant-runoff voting. Many consider majoritarian systems to be undemocratic due to their disproportional results, as opposed to systems of proportional representation or justified representation, which aim to provide equal power to votes.

Definition and types 
A common, loose definition of modern majoritarian systems is that such electoral systems which aims to provide the winning party (the party with a majority of plurality of votes) with enough seats to have a governing majority in an assembly, or at least one which generally favours strong parties disproportionally (as opposed to proportional representation, which generally aims to provide equal representation for every vote). This definition is more often used in non-scientific discussions about electoral systems.The stricter definition of majoritarian representation is the winners of the election according to the voting system get (may force) all seats up for election in their district, denying representation to all minorities. By definition all single-winner voting systems provide majoritarian representation (but not all use a plurality/majority rule). For multi-winner elections, like electing an assembly of representatives, either the whole assembly can be elected with the whole electorate constituting a single electoral district (at-large majoritarian representation) or the electorate can be divided into majoritarian districts, most often single-member districts (SMDs). Today, the term majoritarian representation on its own refers to systems where the majoritarian principle used in local districts, as these are widely used worldwide.

Majoritarian representation  does not mean the party with a plurality or majority always receive a majority of seats, as this is not guaranteed (see Hung parliament) and sometimes the party receiving the most votes get fewer seats than the party with the second most votes (see electoral inversion/majority reversal). This is because modern majoritarian systems use districts, but also because most majoritarian systems focus on individual candidates, instead of political parties. For the systems under which the (relative or absolute) majority wins the election see plurality or majority rule.

The principle of majoritarian democracy does not necessarily imply that a majoritarian electoral system needs to be used, in fact, using proportional systems to elect legislature usually better serve this principle as such aims to ensures that the legislature accurately reflects the whole population, not just the winners of the election and the majority rule is then used within the legislature. The most widely accepted modern views of representative democracy no longer consider majoritarian-at-large representation to be democratic. For this reason, nowadays majoritarian representation is most often used in single-winner districts, which allows nationwide minorities to gain representation if they make up a plurality or majority in at least one district, but some also consider this anti-democratic because of the possibility of an electoral inversion (like in the case of some US presidential elections: 2000, 2016).

Majoritarian and proportional systems are the most commonly used voting system worldwide, followed by mixed electoral systems. which usually combine majoritarian and proportional representation, although there are mixed system that combine two majoritarian systems as well. Majoritarian representation is also contrasted with proportional representation, which provides for representation of political minorities according to their share of the popular vote and semi-proportional representation, which inherently provides for some representation of minorities (at least above a certain threshold). Within mixed systems, mixed-member majoritarian representation (also known as parallel voting) provides semi-proportional representation, as opposed to mixed-member proportional systems.

At-large majoritarian representation 
Historically the first multi-winner electoral systems were majoritarian at-large, namely block voting, or more generally the multiple non-transferable vote.

Theory
The majoritarian right was upheld by a large and important group of scholars. Aristotle launched a theory which was later assumed by many Roman thinkers who said that  quod maior pars curiae efficit, pro eo habetur ac si omnes egerint (the decision taken by the majority of the senators is valid as it would be approved by all). Jean-Jacques Rousseau, consequently to his concept of general will, said that la voix du plus grand nombre oblige toujours tous les autres (the voice of the greater number ever forces all people). Adhémar Esmein said that if the entire country was a single constituency, the electoral majority would have the right to appoint all the deputies, as it appoints the head of the executive power; even in its extreme consequencies, this system does not cause an injustice to the minority, because the majority obtains no more than its right.

Decline
Quite undisputed until the first half of the 19th century, the classic majoritarian system, sometimes referred as block voting, began to be more and more criticized when great ideological differences arose. Corrections were worldwide progressively introduced in two senses:
 a first possibility was to reduce the size of the constituencies, so to divide the election in many local contests, and consequently increase the possibility for the minority to win in some areas. At-large elections were substituted by many multi-member constituencies and, finally, by single-winner electoral districts;
 a second possibility was to introduce corrections even still voting at-large or, at least, in multi-member constituencies:
 the limited voting system allowed the electors to vote a number of candidates which was lower than the contesting seats (limiting the multiple vote);
 the cumulative voting system allowed the electors to concentrate their full share of votes on fewer candidates (keeping the multiple vote, but making it possible to rearrange them);
 the single non-transferable vote was the extreme of the limited vote, the elector having a single choice in a multi-member race (abandoning the multiple vote but keeping the non-transferable property);
 the preferential block voting system allowed the electors to rank the candidates, imposing a quota to be elected (keeping the multiple vote, but abandoning the non-transferable property);
 the single transferable vote limits every voters value to one vote and also imposes a quota  (abandoning both the multiple vote and non-transferable property with classical block voting, establishing proportional representation)
The version of block voting using electoral lists instead of individual candidates (general ticket or party block voting) was almost completely replaced by party-list proportional voting systems, which fully abandon the majoritarian criterion in favour of equal representation. However, with the majority bonus or majority jackpot types of mixed system, this type of majoritarianism at-large has partially reappeared in certain electoral systems.

Majoritarian districts 
Majoritarian representation using single-winner districts is the most common form of pure majoritarian systems today, of which single-member plurality (SMP), which the first-past-the-post (FPTP) system used to elect members of an assembly is single-winner districts, is most widely used to elect legislatures.

However, due to high disproportionalities, it is also considered undemocratic by many. In Europe only Belarus and the United Kingdom use FPTP/SMP to elect the primary (lower) chamber of their legislature and France uses a two-round system (TRS). All other European countries either use proportional representation or use majoritarian representation as part of a mixed-member majoritarian system (Andorra, Italy, Hungary, Lithuania, Russia and Ukraine) or a mixed-member proportional system (Germany). However, other European countries also occasionally use majoritarian systems (apart from single-winner elections, like presidential or mayoral elections) for elections to the secondary chamber (upper house) of their legislature (Poland) and sub-national (local and regional) elections.

Majoritarian system are much more common outside Europe, particularly in the countries of the former British Empire, like Australia (IRV), Bangladesh, Canada, Egypt, India, Pakistan and the United States (FPTP/SMP).

Nowadays, at-large majoritarian representation is used for national elections only in the Senate of the Philippines, while it is sometimes still used for local elections organised on non-partisan bases. Residual usage in several multi-member constituencies is reduced to the election of the Electoral college of the President of the United States. Block voting is also used to elect a part of the assemblies in the regional elections in Italy and France (in these cases, the majoritarian quota is one of two parts of an additional member system) and in municipal elections for settlements below a population of 10000 people in Hungary.

Countries using majoritarian representation 

Below is a table of majoritarian systems currently used on a national level. Single-winner elections (presidential elections) and mixed systems are not included, see List of electoral systems by country for full list of electoral systems.

Key:
 Legislative body
Light blue background indicates upper houses of bicameral legislatures, in countries where such a chamber exists, the (usually more important) lower house might be elected with a majoritarian system as well (in which case it is also in the list) or in might be elected with a different system, in which case (the lower house) is not included in the list. See List of electoral systems by country for full list of electoral systems.
 Light turquoise background  indicates an electoral college elected by a majoritarian system, instead of a chamber of legislature.
Latest election (year), in most cases this election was held under the electoral system indicated, however if the next election is already scheduled to be held under a different system, the new system is indicated and the former system is listed under Notes.
Type of majoritarian system may be
block voting at-large
block voting via multi-member districts or coexistence of multi-member districts and single-winner districts
single-winner districts
or varies by state if different states may set their own system in federal countries
Constituencies indicates if the electoral districts are equivalent to or based on other administrative divisions of the country

Current use

Former use 
Countries that replaced majoritarian representation before 1990 are not (yet) included.

See also
 Semi-proportional representation
 Proportional representation

References

External links
 Block voting

Electoral systems
Non-proportional multi-winner electoral systems